The Howard Miller Company is a Zeeland, Michigan, based manufacturer of longcase clocks and other home furnishings.

History
Howard Miller Clock Company was founded in 1926, as the Herman Miller Clock Company division of office furniture manufacturer Herman Miller, specializing in chiming wall and mantle clocks. It was spun off in 1937 and renamed, under the leadership of Herman Miller's son Howard C. Miller (1905–1995).  Today, there is no connection between the two companies although their headquarters are across the street from one another.

Starting in 1947, the Howard Miller Clock Company produced scores of modern wall clocks and table clocks designed by George Nelson Associates. (At that time, Nelson was Director of Design at Herman Miller Furniture Company.) They also produced Nelson's "Bubble Lighting" through the late 1970s, selling the business in the early 1980s.  (Using the original manufacturing equipment developed by Nelson Associates with Howard Miller, the California furniture company Modernica reintroduced the Bubble Lamps in the 1990s and has been the exclusive manufacturer and worldwide distributor of the lamps since that time).  Howard Miller Clock Company also produced other Nelson Associates products; spice cabinets, pull-down wall mounted vanities and desks, a vertical hanging vinyl strip system  called "Ribbon Wall" (which was available in many different variations from 12 inches to 84" wide and 12" to 144" high), a complete line of fireplace tools, and other hanging lighting (Metalites, Net Lights, Bubbles, and Lanterns)

A number of Nelson's clocks became icons of the era; the Ball, Spike, Block, Spindle, and others were good sellers and have been reissued by Vitra, as well as most of the Zoo Timers clocks, and a select group of table models.

In the 1960s, a line of ceramic wall clocks called "Meridian" was produced using ceramic wall plates designed in Italy and using the Nelson clock hands. This line, as well as the other Nelson clocks and other pieces, was distributed by Richards Morganthau, Inc. (also known as Raymor).

One of the last series of modern clocks were the "Swing Timers", a group of at least 18 inexpensive all plastic clocks produced in the late 1960s and designed by Arthur Umanoff Associates.  Umanoff also designed Plexiglas floor and wall clocks, a series of wood clocks called "Natural Classics", and "Day Timers" (plastic wall clocks with day and dates).  Nathan George Horwitt designed the "Museum Clock" in the 1970' (both wall and table model).  The final George Nelson Associates series of clocks were the 1984 post-modern "Tempo '21 Series".

The modern Nelson and Umanoff clocks were discontinued and these days, the company has little to no interest in that period of modern design.

Expansion 
Originally the company only made mantel clocks.  Grandfather clocks did not become a part of the product line until the 1960s.

The company began making curio cabinets in 1989.

The company acquired the Ridgeway, Hekman and Woodmark companies.

The company began marketing and selling wine and spirits furniture in 2004.

The company launched a line of Home Storage Solutions partnering with celebrity Ty Pennington in 2008.
The company launched a line of furniture partnering with Pennington in 2009.

Trivia
Howard Miller Clock Company owns the Kieninger Company of Germany, which makes many of the mechanical movements in Howard Miller clocks.
During World War II, the Company joined forces with Ford Motor Company in making anti-aircraft covers.
Howard Miller Clocks are a frequent prize on the game show The Price Is Right.
Howard C. Miller's father Herman financially helped D. J. DePree, Herman's son-in-law, found office furniture manufacturer Herman Miller.
Model 612-436 Thomas Tompion has been made for over 25 years and is still made today.

References

Clock manufacturing companies of the United States
Furniture companies of the United States
Manufacturing companies based in Michigan
Ottawa County, Michigan
Zeeland, Michigan
Design companies established in 1926
Manufacturing companies established in 1926
1926 establishments in Michigan
American companies established in 1926